The Urban and Regional Information Systems Association (URISA) is a non-profit association of professionals using geographic information systems (GIS) and other information technologies to solve challenges at all levels of government. URISA promotes the effective and ethical use of spatial information and technology for the understanding and management of urban and regional systems.

History
URISA was formed in 1966, evolving from a loosely associated group of professionals with a common interest in urban planning information systems. The organization emanated from annual conferences held from 1963 through 1966, known then as the Annual Conference on Urban Planning Information Systems and Programs. URISA has since evolved into an international organization supporting professionals with interests in a variety of topics related to development and effective management of geographic information systems (GIS). URISA is currently headquartered in Des Plaines, Illinois, where professional staff handle the administrative functions of the association.

Activities
URISA is the founding member of the GIS Certification Institute, which administers professional certification for the field. 
 URISA is also a founding member of the Coalition of Geospatial Organizations (COGO), a coalition of organizations concerned with U.S. national geospatial issues. GISCorps is a URISA program that provides volunteer GIS services for underdeveloped countries worldwide. URISA's proposed GIS Capability Maturity Model (GIS CMM) provides the means for local governments to gauge their progress in achieving GIS operational maturity against a variety of standards and measures.

URISA promotes data sharing by government organizations, and has approved policy to reflect those values.

URISA hosts a number of conferences each year including GIS-Pro: URISA's Annual Conference for GIS Professionals; the GIS/CAMA Technologies Conference, co-sponsored by the International Association of Assessing Officers; the URISA/NENA Addressing Conference, co-sponsored by the National Emergency Number Association; a biennial GIS in Public Health Conference; Caribbean GIS Conference; and the URISA Leadership Academy, a five-day GIS leadership program.

URISA supports more than two-dozen chapters, primarily across the United States and Canada, with recent expansion into the Caribbean and the United Arab Emirates.

The URISA Journal is a quarterly, peer-reviewed, scholarly publication of the organization. It has a history of open access. URISA additionally maintains a growing publications library. Through an annual competition URISA encourages students to submit a paper for a special section of the URISA Journal.

URISA also recognizes achievements in the industry through a variety of awards, including Exemplary Systems in Government Awards (ESIG) the URISA GIS Hall of Fame, and the Horwood Distinguished Service Award.

Membership
URISA members are professionals in the spatial data industry working in local, regional, state/provincial, tribal and federal government, academia, the private sector, and non-profit organizations.

See also 
 American Congress on Surveying and Mapping
 American Society for Photogrammetry and Remote Sensing
 BURISA (British Urban and Regional Information Systems Association)

References

External links 
 URISA official website

International trade associations
Non-profit organizations based in the United States
Geographic information systems organizations
Geographic data and information organizations in the United States
Information systems
Regional science